Cor de la Bryère (23 April 1968 – 27 April 2000), nicknamed "Corde", is one of the most influential sires in modern warmblood breeding.

Pedigree
Cor de la Bryère  was foaled in France, and was by the Thoroughbred Rantzau, a racehorse and a producer of fantastic jumping horses. His dam, Quenotte B, also had a jumping pedigree, as she was sired by Lurioso, that was sired by the great Furioso. Despite his fantastic pedigree, the French selection committee suggested he be gelded. His owner, Xavier Ribard, decided to sell him.

Pedigree for Cor de la Bryere
1968 Dark bay

Breeding career
The Holsteiner Verband had noticed the success that French blood had in the Oldenburg breed, which had used the stallions Furioso II and Futuro (both by Furioso) to upgrade their stock, and wished to introduce it into their own horses. The Oldenburg breeder Alwin Schockemöhle offered to part-lease the stallion Urioso (by Furioso). An inspection committee travelled to France to evaluate the horse, and happened to find Cor de la Bryère while they were there. The Verband purchased and imported the three-year-old to Schleswig-Holstein, Germany, in 1971. The same year, he was the champion of his 100-day Test.

On April 27, 2000, at the age of 32, Cor de la Bryère was put down due to acute heart disease.

To see an online video of Cor de la Bryère:

Offspring
 Approved sons: 85 (as of 2000)
 States premium mares: 86 (as of 2000)
 Progeny winnings to 1993: 2,000,000+ DM
 Progeny winnings to 1996: 5,581,229 DM

Described by breeders as a 'gift from heaven', Cor de la Bryère has been especially successful producing jumping horses, as he passes on his incredible bascule (see here ), scope, and jumping technique. Cor de la Bryere also passed on his willingness and trainability. Romedio Graf von Thun-Hohenstein described the stallion: 'The arching back, like a taut band of steel combined with the super elastic end gives limitless, but always expedient, springing capability to the natural dynamics of each effort. Add to that ease of riding, marvelous disposition, and a floating, highly balanced canter. These qualities are absolutely to the benefit of young horses, who will no longer have to pay with premature breakdowns caused by jumping and showing solely with a raw, crude jumping talent.'

Cor de la Bryère has had an incredible impact on the Holsteiner breed, occurring in more than 70% of Holsteiner pedigrees, and is credited for improving the breed's jumping technique. He also had a huge impact on the Oldenburg breed.

His influence in France was limited, mainly due to his jumping. Although he was quick to fold his front legs, he did not have great power. When crossed with Holsteiner mares, which provided this power, his offspring were very successful in the show ring. However, the French mares did not have this power, so they were usually a poor cross to Cor de la Bryere.

Cor de la Bryère was especially successful in breeding with certain mares. Tabelle (by Heisporn) produced five approved sons, including Calypso I and Calypso II. Furgund (by Colombo) bred with him 18 times, producing six approved sons (Calando I - VI). Deka produced Caletto I, II and III, all by the stallion.

Cor de la Bryère stood at Siethwende from 1971 to 1984, Zangersheide 1985, Elmshorn 1986 to 1988,
and Sollwittfeld from 1989 until his death in 2000. In his first season, he covered 70 mares, and four colts from his first crop were licensed.

Descendants of Cor de la Bryère

Calando I, Calando II, Calando III, Calando IV, Calando V, Calando VI and Z-Calanda
Furgund, a Colombo daughter from Stamm 7673, was bred 18 times to Cor de la Bryère. The pairing produced 6 approved sons and at least one exceptional daughter, all bred by Hermann-Otto Voß.

Calando I (1974-?) dark bay or brown stallion. With Karsten Huck, he was German Show Jumping Champion and team bronze medallist at the 1984 Olympics. By 1994, his offspring had earned half a million Deutsche Mark and Calando I had produced 180 States Premium daughters. Calando I is the damsire of Carthago, Canturo, Cascavelle, Lord Z and Lord Calando.

Calando II (1975-?) dark bay or brown stallion. Sold to Switzerland for a jumping and breeding career. Of his 819 offspring in Switzerland, he is represented by 28 elite mares and 7 approved sons.

Calando III (1976-?) chestnut stallion. Sold to the Netherlands.

Calando IV (1984-?) dark bay or brown stallion. Approved sire for Holstein with offspring successful in sport.

Z-Calanda (1985-?) mare.
Cap Calando (1991-) dark bay or brown stallion by Capitol I. Licensed in 1997 at Radegast. HLP 1995 in Neustadt/Dosse. International show jumper.
Quita Z (1994-) chestnut mare by Quidam de Revel. Dam of Renegade Z by Ramiro Z.

Calando V (1988-?) bay stallion. Successful up to Class S jumping. His oldest offspring have also reached the S level. HLP 90.93 overall, 114.56 in jumping, 82.64 in dressage. FN breeding value for jumping in 2006 was 112.78%.

Calando VI aka Calando 30 (1989-2020) dark bay or brown stallion. Stands in Portugal. Calando VI was an international show jumper from 1997 until 2008, when he was retired at the age of 19.

Caletto I, Caletto II and Caletto III
The full brothers Caletto I, Caletto II, and Caletto III were out of a Consul daughter, Deka. The pairing of Cor de la Bryere with Deka also produced the States Premium mare Legende. Legende was shown under the sport name "Cordeka" and was a successful show jumper and eventer.

Caletto I (1975–1999) bay stallion. Described as tall and imposing, modern for the time with a handsome face, Caletto I was a jumper of tremendous ability and technique, and a great canter. Caletto I's dam, Deka, produced 11 foals: all but one son became a licensed stallion, and all of her offspring were top-notch competitors. Caletto I was a successful sire in his early years, and it was an injury to his genitals put him on track to become 1985's most successful Nation's Cup jumper in Germany. He earned over 100,000 Deutschmarks in his career as an international show jumper. Following the premature death of his younger full brother, Caletto II, Caletto I was tested in the breeding shed again in 1986. In 1999 Caletto I was ranked #5 among the top sires of show jumpers by the World Breeding Federation for Sport Horses.
Calvaro Z (1987-) bay stallion out of Rixa (Capitol I). International show jumper under Michael and Robert Whitaker, and Jos Lansink. 1997 Dutch National Champion jumper and team silver medalist at the 1997 European Championships. Ninth place individually at the 1998 World Equestrian Games. Member of the British Show Jumping team at the 2000 Sydney Olympic Games.
Cantus (1981-1994) gray stallion out of Monline (Roman). Offspring earnings exceed 1.3 million Euros as of 2004. He left 25 approved sons, and his offspring were considered powerful but willing and uncomplicated, though sometimes plain.
Calvaro V, team silver medal in show jumping at 2000 Sydney Olympic Games under Willi Melliger.
Calido (1991) gray stallion out of Baroness (Coriander). Offspring earnings exceed 700,000 Euros as of 2007. He has over 15 approved sons. #13 sire of international show jumpers according to the 2008 World Breeding Federation for Sport Horses.
Come On (1985-) gray stallion out of Suehne (Landgraf I). Stamm 8769. Licensed in 1989 at Munich. Vice-champion of the 1988 Medingen Stallion Performance Test, with the best scores in rideability and #5 in jumping. In 1990, Come On was the #1 German sire of show jumpers.

Caletto II (1978–1984) dark bay/brown stallion. Caletto II stood only four seasons after he was proclaimed champion of his licensing in 1980. He had excellent Holsteiner type, an exceptional canter and form over fences. Caletto II reared up and fell over backwards at a show jumping event, breaking his neck. During his short tenure as a sire, Caletto II produced Operette La Silla and Jewel's Classic Touch. The latter carried Ludger Beerbaum to an individual gold medal at the 1992 Olympic Games.
Caretino (1983-) dark bay stallion out of Isidor (Metellus). Stamm 826. Twenty States Premium daughters and 30 licensed sons. Caretino is known for producing not only jumping ability, but exceptional movement. Caretino won the 1989 Holstein State Jumping Championship and went on to win the German Federal Jumping Championship. The pair eventually went on to the Nation's Cup level and represented the Danish National team. As of 2001, Caretino had 12 offspring in international show jumping.
Caridor Z (1991-) dark bay stallion out of Adele III (Lantaan). Individual 6th place and team bronze medal at the 2002 Jerez World Cup under Jos Lansink.
Cristallo (1998-) bay gelding out of Cambrina (Cicero). International jumper under Richard Spooner.
Cheenook (1988-2005) dark bay stallion out of Trika (Romantiker). #1 Leading Hunter Sire of 2008. A rare star in the dressage ring for Holstein, Cheenook was trained to the Grand Prix and competed to Intermediare I. His offspring are known for beautiful, correct movement, correctness and affable dispositions.
Caretello B (1988-) dark bay stallion out of Victoria 5 (Calypso IV). 2004 Stallion of the Year, Elite Stallion. Important sire for southern Germany, his offspring have already earned in excess of 1 million euro and he is said to produce quality foals out of the diverse southern mare base. He is also the sire of Cartouche B, a top-ranked show hunter in the United States.
Ballerina (1987-) bay mare out of Vera I (Lorenz). Team gold in show jumping at the 1997 European Championships in Mannheim.
Carpaccio (1991-) bay stallion out of Bettina II (Lantaan). Winner of the 1994 Medingen Stallion Performance test. At 5, a finalist at the German Federal Championships in dressage. His earliest foal crops have resulted in 5 approved sons and 16 States Premium daughters.
Chico's Boy (2000-) dark bay/brown stallion out of Eluna (Silbersee). 2002 Champion Stallion of the Holsteiner Stallion Approvals. Finalist at the German Federal Championships in advanced dressage.
Picolina, mare out of Alma Costa (Coriander). 2003 Holstein Champion mare.
Clintino (1996-) bay stallion out of Orchidee (Come On). Stamm 504. 1998 Champion Stallion of the Bavarian Stallion Approvals.

Caletto III (born 1984) brown stallion. Licensed in 1986 at Neumunster, Reserve Champion stallion for the ZfDP. Completed the 1987 Medingen Stallion Performance Test, placed 11th out of 47 overall. Caletto III was successful in show jumping up to the advanced levels, but was less influential than his older brothers.

Calypso I, Calypso II, Calypso III, Calypso IV, Calypso V
The five full brothers were out of the Heißsporn daughter, Tabelle. Tabelle produced six approved sons in total.

Calypso I (born 1973) bay or brown stallion. Licensed in 1975 at Neumunster, completed the 1976 Adelheidsdorf 100-day stallion performance test. By 1990 his offspring had earned over 100,000 DM in sport, with representatives at the Grand Prix level in both dressage and show jumping. Daughter Zinnia was the 1988 Champion at the Holsteiner Elite Mare Show in Elmshorn.
Chacomo (1989-2001) bay gelding out of Paranka (Marmor). 1999 German Federal Reserve Champion Dressage horse, 1999 Team Gold at the European Dressage Championships, and team gold at the 2000 Sydney Olympics. Ridden by Alexandra Simons De Ridder. Half-brother to Cor Noir.
Calipso (1978-?) chestnut stallion out of Cori (Cromwell). Licensed in 1988 at Oldenburg. Successful up to European Level S show jumping.

Calypso II (1974–1995) brown stallion. Calypso II was known for producing horses with great jumping form and rideability. His offspring earned in excess of 1.5 million Deutschmarks. Cor de la Bryere's blood was first introduced to the Hanoverian breeders through Calypso II, who was leased to Celle State Stud from 1987 to 1989.
Contender (1984-2007) brown stallion out of Gofine (Ramiro). USEF 2008 #25 Dressage sire. One of the most popular sires in Germany. 55 approved sons, 56 states premium daughters. Elite auction horses. FN breeding values list him as one of the most versatile sires.
Montender (1994-) dark bay or brown stallion out of J'Esprit (Burggraaf). Jumped under Marco Kutscher to individual bronze and team gold in the 2004 Olympics.
Contango (1988-) brown stallion out of Adisa III (Kronprinz xx). USEF #2 Dressage Sire and WBFSH #14 Dressage Sire in 2008. Influential sport horse sire in North America.
Contendro (1997-) brown stallion out of Bravo (Reichsgraf). USEF #50 Dressage Sire and #35 Hunter Breeding Sire in 2008.

Calypso III

Calypso IV (born 1978) black stallion. Licensed in 1980 at Neumunster, completed the 1981 Adelheidsdorf 100-day stallion performance test. From 1983 to 1987 he was exclusively a show jumper, and was successful up to S-level. His offspring in show jumping include C'est la Vie 5, Caribo 4, Chablis 13, Charlie Brown 16, Costa Rica 16, Tie Break III, and Picolina.

Calypso V, chestnut stallion. Sold to Brazil after a year at stud on account of his chestnut coat.

Cavalier Royale, Cicero & Cicera
Cavalier Royale, Cicero and their full sister Cicera are out of the Liguster daughter, Ligustra.

Cavalier Royale (born 1978) dark bay or brown stallion. Cavalier Royale is the #1 sire of FEI eventing horses by the 2008 World Breeding Federation for Sport Horses rankings. His offspring include Rolex CCI**** winner Ben Along Time and Olympic team bronze medalist Call Again Cavalier.

Cicero (born 1982) dark bay or brown stallion. Reserve champion stallion at the 1984 Neumunster licensing. Sire of an Elmshorn champion mare and the 1998 German Federal Reserve Champion 6 y/o jumper.

Come Back I & Come Back II

Come Back I (born 1990) brown stallion out of Amoene (Landgraf I). Successful to UK Level A in dressage and UK Level B in show jumping.

Come Back II (born 1992) brown stallion out of Amoene (Landgraf I). Winner of the Danish materiale test. A-level in dressage, B-level in jumping. Top scores for character. Danish 2002 Horse of the Year. 2001 and 2002 winningest dressage horse in Denmark. Premium-elite.

Corde Star
( 1996- )(Cor de la Bryere / Ronald / Landgraf I) till July 2004 was a horse of the top Lithuanian rider R. Babrauskas. They succeed in many international show jumping competitions - CHIO Lanaken, CSIO Tallinn, CSI-W Vilnius, twice in Championship of Lithuania. 

St.Pr.St. Cicera (born 1988) bay mare. States Premium mare. Dam of Kira (Carthago) ridden in the Grand Prix jumpers by Ludo Philappaerts and Cicera's Icewater, approved stallion in the United States. Cicera's Icewater, licensed in 2002, was the highest bonited stallion ever in North America. Cicera's Icewater is training with David O'Connor.

Corland

Corland (1989-) gray stallion out of Thyra (Landgraf I). Ridden by W.J. van der Schans, Corland had a successful career in international show jumping. He placed highly at the FEI Grand Prix of Oslo, Helsinki, Bordeaux, Den Bosch, Lanaken, Den Bosch, Zuidlaren, La Baule, Maastricht, Rotterdam, The Hague and Calgary. The pair finished 7th at the World Cup in Verona and 9th at the 2001 European Championships. By the 2008 United States Equestrian Federation rankings, Corland is the #7 sire of show hunters. By the 2008 World Breeding Federation for Sporthorses rankings, he is also one of the top 30 leading sires of international show jumpers. In the early 1990s he was brought to Denmark and was part of the stallions at Stutteri Volstrup where we sired many great stallions. One great offspring is Rockland which mother Kimberly is sired by Nimmerdor. Kimberlys mother was sired by Caracas which is also a son of Cor de la Bryere. In Denmark Corland is known as Corlando.

Corrado I & Corrado II

Corrado I (born 1985) gray stallion out of Soleil (Capitol I). Stamm 6879. Through his dam's grandsire, Corrado I combines the blood of Cottage Son xx with that of Cor de la Bryère. Furthermore, he was unrelated to Ladykiller xx. All of these factors contributed to Corrado's own success, and his success as a match to the Holsteiner broodmare population. As a six-year-old, Corrado I was a finalist at the 1991 German Federal Championships, and he began his international career the following year under Franke Sloothaak. The qualities that made Corrado I a Nations Cup-caliber jumper - cleverness, quick reflexes, power, and speed - also made him a challenging partner. Sloothaak described the young stallion as distractible with a strong temperament, and quite difficult to ride. The pair competed on the international circuit to the World Cup level. As of 2006, Corrado I has produced 95 offspring for the international level show jumping arena. In 2008, Corrado I was ranked in 19th in the WBFSH list of top sires of FEI jumpers. 
Clinton (1993-) gray stallion out of Urte I (Masetto). Clinton, with Dirk Demeersman aboard, was fourth in the overall rankings at the 2004 Athens Olympic Games. He is a top sire, especially in Belgium, and his offspring have already achieved at the highest levels.
Cornet Obolensky (1999-) gray stallion out of Rabanna van Costersveld (Heartbreaker). Cornet Obolensky was vice-champion of the Westphalian approvals in 2001, and began his jumping career in 2003 under Ludger Beerbaum and then Marco Kutscher. Cornet Obolensky was a finalist in the German Federal Championships, and participated in the 2008 Beijing Summer Olympic games. His offspring have included elite auction-toppers.
Indorado (1990-) gray stallion out of Aida (Ahorn Z). Indorado's offspring include international jumpers VDL Oranta ridden by Chris Kappler, and Eurocommerce Milano and Eurocommerce Lanapoule ridden by G. Schröder. Indorado was twice a finalist at the German Federal Championships, and had his own international show jumping career. In 2008, Indorado was ranked in 14th in the WBFSH list of top sires of FEI jumpers.
Contango . Influential sire of sport horses in North America.

Corrado II

Cordalmé Z

Cordalmé Z (1986-) chestnut stallion out of Aleska (Almé Z). Premium-awarded at the 1988 Oldenburg stallion approvals. International show jumper under Gilbert Böckmann, winner of Grand Prix' and Nations Cups. Short-listed for the 1996 Atlanta Olympic games.
Couleur Rubin (1996-) chestnut stallion out of Grannuschka (Grannus). International show jumper under Ludger Beerbaum. 2001 Vice-champion five-year-old jumper at the German Federal Championships. Premium-awarded at the 1998 Oldenburg stallion approvals. Competitor at the 2005 Las Vegas World Cup. Known for having high-quality gaits for a jumper sire.
Couleur Rouge (2002-) chestnut stallion out of Grannuschka (Grannus). Premium-awarded at the 2004 Oldenburg stallion approvals. 2008 Champion four-year-old jumper in the region of Oldenburg.
Careful 23 (1991-) chestnut gelding. Under Andre Sakakini, represented Egypt at the 2000 Sydney Olympics.
Calwaro (1992-) chestnut gelding. Represented Argentina at the 2000 Sydney Olympics and 2004 Athens Olympics under Martin Dopazo.

Cabaret & Corlandus
The full brothers Cabaret and Corlandus are out of the Landgraf daughter, Gustia.

Cabaret (1980–1999) bay stallion. Flagship stallion at the influential North American breeding farm, Hilltop Farm. United States Dressage Federation #1 Grand Prix Dressage horse in 1992 and 1993. Sire of premium mares and foals for both the Holsteiner and Oldenburg associations in the United States.

Corlandus (born 1976) bay gelding. 1987 European Dressage Champion and Individual Silver Medalist at the 1988 Olympics under Margit Otto-Crepin.

Cor de Brilliant

Cor de Brilliant (1983-) chestnut stallion out of Lucca (Lupus). Licensed in 1985 at Munich and approved after finishing third out of 30 peers at the 1986 Munich-Riem Stallion performance test. In 1986 he qualified for the German Federal Riding Horse Championships in Aachen as a 3 year old competitor in the Materiale class. He was ranked the top Bavarian riding horse that year and the following year, when he was Materiale champion. As a mature horse, Cor de Brilliant competed in show jumping to the M level.

Cor Noir
Cor Noir (1987–2003) black stallion out of Paranka (Marmor). Licensed in 1989 at Neumunster and approved after completing the Medingen 100 day stallion performance test in 1991, where he earned Class I status. His talent was for dressage and he was an influential sire of sport horses in North America. Paranka is also the dam of Chacomo by Calypso I.

Carte D'or

Carte D'or (1987-) brown stallion out of Themse (Landgraf I). 168 cm. Stamm 2137. Bred by Juergen Voss. Licensed in 1989 at Elmshorn. HLP in 1990 at Munster where he was 5th out of 37 overall (122.56), scoring a 123.12 (5th place) in dressage and a 121.60 (5th place) in jumping. He was noted for an exceptional temperament.

Chairman
Chairman (1985-) dark bay or brown stallion out of Ira III (Lord). 170 cm. Stamm 390. Bred by Georg Clausen. Licensed in 1987 in Neumunster, HLP in 1988 at Medingen. Sire of the Hessen Champion Colt in 1990. Chairman went on to compete up to S level show jumping (1.5 meters), including performances at the Stallion Championships in Zwolle. He was an important sire in Hesse before being exported to the UK in 1998.

Chaka Khan
Chaka Khan (1989-) bay stallion out of Wurzel (Romino). . Stamm 776. Bred by Ernst Krueger. Winning Regular Working and Regular Conformation Hunter, and upper level show jumper, in North America. Wins and high placings in the San Juan Capistrano Classic and the Oaks Classic.

References

External links 
 Cor de la Bryere's pedigree
  Photo of Corde jumping

German show jumping horses
Sport horse sires
1968 animal births
2000 animal deaths
Individual male horses
Individual Selle Français horses